The Vânăta is a left tributary of the river Mostiștea in Romania. It flows into the Mostiștea in Siliștea.

References

Rivers of Romania
Rivers of Călărași County
Rivers of Ialomița County